KXTD (1530 AM, "Que Buena 1530 AM") is a radio station licensed to serve Wagoner, Oklahoma. The station is owned by Jose Esteban Torres and Jose Moguel, through licensee Key Plus Broadcasting, LLC. It airs a Regional Mexican music format.

The station has been assigned these call letters by the Federal Communications Commission since February 23, 1988.

Translators

References

External links
KXTD official website

XTD
XTD
Regional Mexican radio stations in the United States
Radio stations established in 1966
1966 establishments in Oklahoma
XTD